Canaan Township is one of the fourteen townships of Madison County, Ohio, United States.  The 2000 census found 2,496 people in the township.

Geography
Located in the northeastern part of the county, it borders the following townships:
Darby Township - north
Washington Township, Franklin County - northeast
Brown Township, Franklin County - east
Jefferson Township - south
Monroe Township - west

No municipalities are located in Canaan Township.

Name and history
As of 1854, the population of the township was 685, 842 in 1890, 881 in 1900, and 921 in 1910.
Statewide, other Canaan Townships are located in Athens, Morrow, and Wayne counties.

Government
The township is governed by a three-member board of trustees, who are elected in November of odd-numbered years to a four-year term beginning on the following January 1. Two are elected in the year after the presidential election and one is elected in the year before it. There is also an elected township fiscal officer, who serves a four-year term beginning on April 1 of the year after the election, which is held in November of the year before the presidential election. Vacancies in the fiscal officership or on the board of trustees are filled by the remaining trustees.

References

External links
County website

Townships in Madison County, Ohio
Townships in Ohio